Ampharetinae are a subfamily of terebellid "bristle worm" (class Polychaeta). They are the largest subfamily of the Ampharetidae, of which they contain the great majority of the described genera.

The majority of ampharetines are marine organisms like usual for polychaetes. However, some members of this subfamily are among the rare euryhaline polychaetes, inhabiting brackish and freshwater habitat. They are generally smallish deposit feeders which frequently live in small tubes they build from mud or similar substrate, or burrow in the sand.

Genera
The World Register of Marine Species recognizes the following 47 genera:

 Abderos Schüller & Jirkov, 2013
 Adercodon Mackie, 1994
 Alkmaria Horst, 1919
 Ampharana Hartman, 1967
 Ampharete Malmgren, 1866
 Amphicteis Grube, 1850
 Amythas Benham, 1921
 Amythasides Eliason, 1955
 Andamanella Holthe, 2002
 Anobothrus Levinsen, 1884
 Auchenoplax Ehlers, 1887
 Decemunciger Zottoli, 1982
 Ecamphicteis Fauchald, 1972
 Eclysippe Eliason, 1955
 Emaga Hartman, 1978
 Endecamera Zottoli, 1982
 Eusamythella Hartman, 1971
 Glyphanostomum Levinsen, 1884
 Gnathampharete Desbruyères, 1978
 Grassleia Solis-Weiss, 1993
 Jugamphicteis Fauchald & Hancock, 1981
 Lysippe Malmgren, 1866
 Melinnampharete Annenkova, 1937
 Melinnata Hartman, 1965
 Melinnoides Benham, 1927
 Neopaiwa Hartman & Fauchald, 1971
 Neosabellides Hessle, 1917
 Neosamytha Hartman, 1967
 Orochi Reuscher, Fiege & Imajima, 2015
 Pabits Chamberlin, 1919
 Paedampharete Russell, 1987
 Paiwa Chamberlin, 1919
 Parampharete Hartman, 1967
 Paramphicteis Caullery, 1944
 Paramytha Kongsrud, Eilertsen, Alvestad, Kongshavn & Rapp, 2017
 Phyllampharete Hartman & Fauchald, 1971
 Phyllamphicteis Augener, 1918
 Phyllocomus Grube, 1877
 Samytha Malmgren, 1866
 Samythella Verrill, 1873
 Samythopsis McIntosh, 1885
 Sosane Malmgren, 1866
 Tanseimaruana Imajima, Reuscher & Fiege, 2013
 Watatsumi Reuscher, Fiege & Imajima, 2015
 Weddellia Hartman, 1967
 Ymerana Holthe, 1986
 Zatsepinia Jirkov, 1986

References

Terebellida